This is a list of years in Mexican television.

Twenty-first century

Twentieth century

See also 
 List of years in television

Television
Television in Mexico by year
Mexican television